Jacques Ancel (22 July 1879 in Parmain, Val-d'Oise – 1943 Alloue Charente) was a French geographer and geopolitician. He is author of several books, including Peoples and Nations of Balkans: political geography (1926) and Geopolitics (1936).

After studying history and geography and professing as a teacher, Ancel was drafted to fight in World War I. Wounded three times, he was detached to the Headquarters of the French Army's Oriental Corps (fighting in the Ottoman Empire and the Balkans). After the war, he helped mediate the tense relations between Yugoslavia and Bulgaria. In 1930, Ancel obtained his doctorate with the thesis La Macédoine, étude de colonisation contemporaine ("Macedonia, a study in contemporary colonization").

He taught at the University of Paris' Institute of Higher International Studies, and was a corresponding member of the Romanian Academy and of other scientific forums. He was a knight of the Légion d'honneur.

Works
1901, Une page inédite de Saint-Simon
1902, La Formation de la colonie du Congo Français (1843–1882), Paris, Bulletin du Comité de l'Afrique Française
1919, L'unité de la politique bulgare, 1870–1919, Editions Bossard
1921, Les Travaux et les jours de l'Armée d'Orient. 1915–1918
1923, Manuel historique de la question d'Orient (1792–1923), Delagrave
1926, Peuples et nations des Balkans (réédité par CTHS en 1992)
1929, Histoire contemporaine depuis le milieu du XIXe siècle (avec la collaboration d'Henri Calvet). Manuel de politique européenne, histoire diplomatique de l'Europe (1871–1914), PUF
1930, La Macédoine, étude de colonisation contemporaine
1936, Géopolitique, Paris, Delagrave
1938, Géographie des frontières, préface d'André Siegfried, Paris, Gallimard
1940, Manuel Géographique de politique européenne. 2. L'Allemagne, Paris, Delagrave
1945, Slaves et Germains, Paris, Librairie Armand Colin, 1945.

1879 births
1942 deaths
People from Val-d'Oise
French geographers
20th-century French historians
French military personnel of World War I
Geopoliticians
Corresponding members of the Romanian Academy
Chevaliers of the Légion d'honneur
French male non-fiction writers